Fredericella is a genus of bryozoans belonging to the family Fredericellidae.

The genus has cosmopolitan distribution.

Species:

Fredericella australiensis 
Fredericella browni 
Fredericella indica 
Fredericella sultana 
Fredericella tenax 
Fredericella toriumii

References

Bryozoan genera